KVGB-FM (104.3 FM) is a radio station broadcasting a classic rock music format. Licensed to Great Bend, Kansas, United States, the station serves the West Kansas area.  The station is currently owned by Eagle Communications.

References

External links

VGB-FM
Classic rock radio stations in the United States
Radio stations established in 1977
1977 establishments in Kansas